Human Remains is a 1998 Danish-American documentary short film written and directed by filmmaker Jay Rosenblatt.

Summary
It reveals every intimate and mundane detail about the personal lives of Adolf Hitler, Benito Mussolini, Joseph Stalin, Francisco Franco and Mao Zedong while illustrating the banality of evil.

Production
Even though it is only a 30-minute film, it took Jay Rosenblatt 3 years to complete it with eight months of research.

Accolades
The film has won over 27 awards including a Sundance Jury Award.

References

External links

Human Remains at Jay Rosenblatt Films
Excerpt

1998 films
American documentary films
Danish documentary films
Films about dictators
Documentary films about Adolf Hitler
Documentary films about Benito Mussolini
Films about Joseph Stalin
Films about Francisco Franco
Works about Mao Zedong
Collage film
Films directed by Jay Rosenblatt
1990s American films